Krzysztof Kłosek (Świętochłowice, 16 July 1978) is a Polish singer and bass guitarist.

He has been a member of Horrorscope (2010 to 2012), Black From The Pit (2003 to 2012), Darzamat (2005 to 2007), Thorn.S (1999 to 2005 and 2008 to 2010) and Killjoy (2008 and 2009 to 2010).

Discography
 Thorn.S - From the Inside (1999)
 Thorn.S - Place Of No Return (2001)
 Thorn.S - Promo MMIII (2003)
 Black From The Pit - Doublecrow Soul (2004)
 Darzamat - Transkarpatia (2005)
 Darzamat - Live Profanity (Visiting the Graves of Heretic) (2007)

References

1978 births
Living people
Polish heavy metal bass guitarists
People from Świętochłowice
Polish heavy metal singers
21st-century Polish male singers
21st-century Polish singers
Male bass guitarists
21st-century bass guitarists
Polish male guitarists